Woodburn may refer to:

 Woodburn (surname)

Places
 Woodburn, New South Wales, Australia
 Woodburn, Nova Scotia, Canada
 Woodburn, an area of Dalkeith, Midlothian, Scotland

United States
Delaware Governor's Mansion, also known as Woodburn
 Woodburn, Indiana 
 Woodburn, Iowa
 Woodburn, Kentucky
 Woodburn, Oregon
Woodburn (Pendleton, South Carolina), listed on the National Register of Historic Places (NRHP)
Woodburn (Charles City, Virginia), listed on the National Register of Historic Places
Woodburn (Charlottesville, Virginia), listed on the National Register of Historic Places
Woodburn (Leesburg, Virginia), listed on the National Register of Historic Places